The Korea Institute of Nuclear Safety (KINS) in Daejeon, South Korea was independently established as the nuclear safety regulatory expert organization in February 1990 with a specific mission to develop and implement nuclear safety regulation. The ultimate goal of nuclear safety regulation is to protect the public and to preserve the environment from the radiation hazards that might be accompanied with the production or utilization of nuclear energy. Accomplishing its precious mission, KINS will make every effort to realize VISION 2020‘ Heart of Global Nuclear Safety’.

The vision of KINS is Heart of Global Nuclear Safety that means KINS becomes the "heart of global nuclear safety" trusted by the people and the world, by being committed to nuclear safety with the best expertise and leadership.

External links
KINS website

Nuclear power in South Korea
Nuclear organizations